Grímsey Airport  is an airport serving Grímsey, a small island  north of Iceland.

Airlines and destinations

Statistics

Passengers and movements

See also 
 Transport in Iceland
 List of airports in Iceland

Notes

References

External links 
 OpenStreetMap - Grímsey
 OurAirports - Grímsey

Airports in Iceland
Akureyri